Rovegno is a comune (municipality) in the Metropolitan City of Genoa in the Italian region Liguria, located about  northeast of Genoa, in the Val Trebbia. 
Rovegno borders the following municipalities: Fascia, Fontanigorda, Gorreto, Ottone, Rezzoaglio.

References

External links
 Official website
 www.altavaltrebbia.net/rovegno.htm

Cities and towns in Liguria